Serrivomer garmani is an eel in the family Serrivomeridae (sawtooth eels). It was described by Léon Bertin in 1944. It is a marine, deep water-dwelling eel which is known from the Indian Ocean.

References

Serrivomeridae
Fish described in 1944
Taxa named by Léon Bertin